Married by Mom and Dad is a reality show on TLC. It premiered on December 13, 2015. It produced two seasons with a total of 20 episodes. Its last show premiered on February 6, 2017.

Episodes
 Episode 1: Meet the Parents premiered on December 13, 2015
 Episode 2: Date My Parents premiered on December 20, 2015
 Episode 3: Cut the Bull$#!% premiered on December 27, 2015
 Episode 4: Cold Feet premiered on January 3, 2016
 Episode 5: Red Flags premiered on January 10, 2016
 Episode 6: I'm Done premiered on January 17, 2016
 Episode 7: The Big Reveal premiered on January 24, 2016
 Episode 8: it's Over premiered on January 31, 2016
 Episode 9: Second Thoughts premiered on February 14, 2016
 Episode 10: Happily Ever After? premiered on February 21, 2016

References

External links
 Official page

TLC (TV network) original programming
2010s American reality television series
2015 American television series debuts
2017 American television series endings